Atonement is the concept of a person taking action to correct previous wrongdoing on their part.

Atonement may also refer to:

Religion
 Atonement in Judaism
 Yom Kippur, the Day of Atonement, the biblical/Jewish observance
 Atonement in Christianity
 Atonement (governmental view)
 Atonement (moral influence view)
 Atonement (penal substitution view)
 Atonement (ransom view)
 Atonement (satisfaction view)
 Substitutionary atonement
 Society of the Atonement
Universal atonement, as in:
Unlimited atonement, the doctrine that the atonement is unlimited in extent
Universal reconciliation, the doctrine that all will eventually come to salvation
Atonement Academy, a parochial Catholic school in San Antonio, Texas
 Blood atonement, a concept in Mormonism
 Day of Atonement (Nation of Islam)
 Vergangenheitsbewältigung, post-WW2 German denazification and repentance

Arts, entertainment, and media

Films
 Atonement (1919 film), an American drama film directed by William Humphrey
 Atonement (2007 film), a British film directed by Joe Wright, based on Ian McEwan's novel

Music

Albums and soundtracks
 Atonement (Your Memorial album) and its title track, 2010
  Atonement (Immolation album), 2017
 Atonement (Killswitch Engage album), 2019
 Atonement (soundtrack), the soundtrack from the 2007 film Atonement

Songs
 "Atonement", a song by Opeth from the album Ghost Reveries
 "Atonement", a song by The Roots from the album Game Theory
 "Atonement", a song by Bloc Party, a b-side to their single "I Still Remember"
 "Atonement", a song by Heaven Shall Burn of their Iconoclast (Part 1: The Final Resistance)

Other arts, entertainment, and media
 "Atonement" (Babylon 5), a Babylon 5 television series episode
 Atonement (novel), a 2001 novel by Ian McEwan
 Tsugunai: Atonement, a 2001 role-playing videogame